Vernon Dias (11 January 1900 – 14 January 1963) was a Guyanese cricketer. He played in five first-class matches for British Guiana from 1922 to 1926.

See also
 List of Guyanese representative cricketers

References

External links
 

1900 births
1963 deaths
Guyanese cricketers
Guyana cricketers